The 2015 Korea Masters Grand Prix Gold was the sixteenth badminton tournament of the 2015 BWF Grand Prix and Grand Prix Gold. The tournament was held in Hwasan Gymnasium, Jeonju, South Korea November 3–8, 2015 and had a total purse of $120,000.

Men's singles

Seeds

  Son Wan-ho (semifinals)
  Lee Hyun-il (final)
  Hsu Jen-hao (first round)
  Lee Dong-keun (champion)
  Brice Leverdez (first round)
  Jeon Hyeok-jin (semifinals)
  Ihsan Maulana Mustofa (first round)
  Jonatan Christie (quarterfinals)
  Zulfadli Zulkiffli (third round)
  Kazumasa Sakai (third round)
  Misha Zilberman (withdrew)
  Adrian Dziolko (second round)
  Anthony Sinisuka Ginting (second round)
  Petr Koukal (first round)
  Iskandar Zulkarnain Zainuddin (second round)
  Soo Teck Zhi (second round)

Finals

Top half

Section 1

Section 2

Section 3

Section 4

Bottom half

Section 5

Section 6

Section 7

Section 8

Women's singles

Seeds

  Sung Ji-hyun (first round)
  Sun Yu (final)
  Bae Yeon-ju (semifinals)
  Sayaka Sato (champion)
  Kim Hyo-min (second round)
  Kaori Imabeppu (quarterfinals)
  Aya Ohori (first round)
  Cheng Chi-ya (second round)

Finals

Top half

Section 1

Section 2

Bottom half

Section 3

Section 4

Men's doubles

Seeds

  Lee Yong-dae / Yoo Yeon-seong (quarterfinals)
  Ko Sung-hyun / Shin Baek-cheol (final)
  Kim Gi-jung / Kim Sa-rang (champion)
  Li Junhui / Liu Yuchen (semifinals)
  Wahyu Nayaka / Ade Yusuf (second round)
  Kenta Kazuno / Kazushi Yamada (quarterfinals)
  Marcus Fernaldi Gideon / Kevin Sanjaya Sukamuljo (second round)
  Wang Yilyu / Zhang Wen (quarterfinals)

Finals

Top half

Section 1

Section 2

Bottom half

Section 3

Section 4

Women's doubles

Seeds

  Shizuka Matsuo / Mami Naito (first round)
  Go Ah-ra / Yoo Hae-won (semifinals)
  Ayane Kurihara / Naru Shinoya (quarterfinals)
  Chae Yoo-jung / Kim So-yeong (second round)
  Chang Ye-na / Lee So-hee (champion)
  Jung Kyung-eun / Shin Seung-chan (final)
  Huang Dongping / Ou Dongni (second round)
  Suci Rizky Andini / Suci Rizky Andini (second round)

Finals

Top half

Section 1

Section 2

Bottom half

Section 3

Section 4

Mixed doubles

Seeds

  Ko Sung-hyun / Kim Ha-na (champion)
  Evgenij Dremin / Evgenia Dimova (first round)
  Ronald Alexander / Melati Daeva Oktaviani (second round)
  Huang Kaixiang / Huang Dongping (second round)
  Shin Baek-cheol / Chae Yoo-jung (final)
  Choi Sol-gyu / Eom Hye-won (semifinals)
  Alfian Eko Prasetya / Annisa Saufika (first round)
  Chen Hung-ling / Hu Ling-fang (first round)

Finals

Top half

Section 1

Section 2

Bottom half

Section 3

Section 4

References

External links
 Tournament link

Korea Masters
Korea
Korea Masters Prix Gold
Sports competitions in Jeonju
Korea Masters Grand Prix Gold
November 2015 sports events in South Korea